Sheykhlar-e Sofla (also Romanized as Sheykhlar-e Soflá; also known as Sheykhlar) is a village in Maraveh Tappeh Rural District, in the Central District of Maraveh Tappeh County, Golestan Province, Iran. At the 2006 census, its population was 506, in 102 families.

References 

Populated places in Maraveh Tappeh County